Nationality words link to articles with information on the nation's poetry or literature (for instance, Irish or France).

Events

Works published

French language
 Jacques Peletier, translation from the Latin of Horace, Ars Poetica, France
 Clément Marot, Trente psaumes de David, translation of the Book of Psalms, France
 Loys Bourgeois sometime between this year and 1551, Psautier huguenot, Switzerland

Other
 Anonymous, sometimes attributed to Edward Gosynhyll, but which he replied to in  1542; two other replies:  1542, by Robert Burdet and The Defence of Women 1560, Edward More; Great Britain
 Francesco Berni Orlando innamorato, heroic-comic poem, published posthumously, Italy

Births
Death years link to the corresponding "[year] in poetry" article:

Deaths
Birth years link to the corresponding "[year] in poetry" article:
 Giovanni Guidiccioni (born 1480), Italian
 Gül Baba (born unknown), Ottoman Bektashi dervish poet and companion of Sultan Suleiman the Magnificent
 Celio Calcagnini (born 1479), Italian, Latin-language poet

See also

 Poetry
 16th century in poetry
 16th century in literature
 French Renaissance literature
 Renaissance literature
 Spanish Renaissance literature

Notes

16th-century poetry
Poetry